Moscow Noir is a Swedish-Russian financial thriller television series. It focusses on Tom Blixen (played by Adam Pålsson), an investment manager from Sweden who is involved in a shady trade deal with an oil company in Moscow. It is set in Moscow 1999.

Production 
The series is based on the novel The Conductor from Saint Petersburg by Camilla Grebe and Paul Leander-Engström, adapted by Aleksi Bardy, Mia Ylönen, Max Barron. It was produced by Black Spark Film & TV and the producer was Piodor Gustafsson. The director was Mikael Håfström. It consists of 8 episodes.

Cast 
 Adam Pålsson – Tom Blixen/Johan Berg
 Karolina Gruszka – Olga Ukolova
 Linda Zilliacus – Rebecka Ekholm
 Georg Nikoloff – Dmitri Skurov
 Christopher Wagelin – Fredrik Kastrup
 Brian McCardie – Lord Pendergast
 Juris Zagars – Strelka
 Gediminas Storpirstis – Kruglov

Broadcasters 
It was originally broadcast in Sweden on C More Entertainment and in Poland on Platforma Canal+. In the United Kingdom it was streamed on All4's Walter Presents, where is premiered on the 13th of September 2020  In Australia it was broadcast on SBS.

References 

2010s Swedish television series
Swedish drama television series
Swedish crime television series
2018 Swedish television series debuts
Swedish-language television shows
Television series by StudioCanal